Robi Chowdhury is a Bangladeshi singer, who gained popularity in the 1990s as a background score for films. As of February 2019, he has released 64 audio albums. He was also a playback singer in 70 to 80 Bangladeshi films.

Personal life
Robi Chowdhury was married thrice. He married Rifat Ara Ramiza on 14 February 2015. The couple has one daughter. He was previously married to musician Dolly Sayontoni and another, who divorced.

Musical career 
Robi Chowdhury's first audio album was released by a company called 'Selex'. He also lent his voice to film songs and also composed music for several films. His first film as a music director was 'Andolan' and his last film was 'Putra Nak Paisawala'. He owns Rimzhim Studio.

References

External links 

 

Year of birth missing (living people)
Living people
Bangladeshi singers
G-Series (record label) artists